Coming Home is a 2020 Philippine drama film directed by Adolfo Alix Jr. under Maverick Films. It is an official entry of the 2020 Metro Manila Film Festival.

Premise
Benny Librada (Jinggoy Estrada) works in Qatar, as a means of livelihood for his family back in the Philippines. Caught in a vulnerable situation, he falls for Mercy Dungca (Ariella Arida) who works as a nurse in the Gulf country with Dungca becoming Benny's "reluctant mistress". Back in the Philippines, the Librada matriarch, Salve (Sylvia Sanchez) aims to keep her family together while concealing that she has terminal illness.

Cast
Jinggoy Estrada as Benedicto "Benny" Librada
Sylvia Sanchez as Salve Librada
Ariella Arida as Mercy Dungca
Edgar Allan Guzman as Neb
Martin del Rosario as Yuri
Jake Ejercito as Enji
Shaira Diaz as Sally

The cast also include Vin Abrenica, Jana Agoncillo, Julian Estrada, Smokey Manaloto, Samantha Lopez, Almira Muhlach, Luis Hontiveros, Alvin Anson, Chanel Morales, and Orlan Wamar.  Geneva Cruz is also part of Coming Home cast with her role credited under a special participation billing.

Production
Coming Home was produced under Maverick Films with Adolfo Alix Jr. as its director. Alix came up with the initial concept story for Coming Home while Gina Marissa Tagasa was responsible for the film's screenplay. The film's plot is reportedly partially inspired from true-to-life events.

Release
Coming Home will be first made available online through Upstream on December 25, 2020, as an official entry to the 2020 Metro Manila Film Festival. It is distributed under ALV Films.

References

Films set in Qatar
Films set in the Philippines
2020s Christmas drama films
Films not released in theaters due to the COVID-19 pandemic
Philippine Christmas drama films
Films directed by Adolfo Alix Jr.